Annasagar is a village in the Bhoothpur mandal, Mahabubnagar district, Telangana, India.  the 2011 Census of India, it had a population of 2,421 across 550 households. There were 1,236 males and 1,185 females. 311 were 6 years old or under. 1,199 were literate.

References 

Mahbubnagar district